Abdelaziz Bennij (born October 8, 1965) is a Moroccan former professional footballer. He played as a midfielder. During his career, he was awarded 34 caps for the Morocco national football team.

In 2012–2013 and in early 2014 Bennij worked as the football team manager with Al-Arabi SC (Qatar). In 2015, he was appointed as the head coach of the Qatari women's team.

References

External links
Abdelaziz Bennij profile at chamoisfc79.fr

1965 births
Living people
Moroccan footballers
Footballers from Casablanca
Morocco international footballers
Moroccan expatriate footballers
Association football midfielders
Wydad AC players
AS Nancy Lorraine players
Chamois Niortais F.C. players
SV Eintracht Trier 05 players
SO Cholet players
Ligue 1 players
Ligue 2 players